Culleoka is a populated place in Collin County, Texas, United States.

Population
In 1892 Culleoka had an estimated population of 20. It grew to 50 during the period of 1893 to 1906 and then to 150 over the next several decades until the late 1940s after which it began to decline.

History
Culleoka was  formed in the late 1880s after its first settlers erected a general store in 1887. It was named after their hometown of Culleoka in Maury County, Tennessee. A mill and cotton gin were operating there by 1900. A post office served the town from 1893 to 1906. When the mail service ceased in 1906 it ran thereafter through McKinney in Collin County. The town had a high school, three or four businesses, and four churches in the 1930s but the population began to decline in the late 1940s. This was partly due to the growth of nearby Plano. With the completion of the Lavon Dam in 1954 by the United States Army Corps of Engineers, which resulted in creating a large reservoir, the area faced further disruption. It still existed as a community in 1990.

References

External links 
 TopoQuest
 TX HomeTownLocator
 Roadside Thoughts

Unincorporated communities in Collin County, Texas
Unincorporated communities in Texas